The Battle of Johnstown was one of the last battles in the northern theatre of the American Revolutionary War, with approximately 1,400 engaged at Johnstown, New York on October 25, 1781. British regulars and militia, commanded by Major John Ross of the King's Royal Regiment of New York and Captain Walter Butler of Butler's Rangers, had raided the border area. Local American forces, led by Colonel Marinus Willett, blocked the British advance. As the British withdrew northwards Willett and his men marched to German Flatts to try to cut them off. The British managed to escape, but Walter Butler was killed.

Background

New York's Mohawk Valley had been a major area of internecine warfare throughout the American Revolution. By 1780 raids conducted by British soldiers, mercenaries, loyalist militia, and their Mohawk allies had devastated the valley. The 1780 fall crop had been destroyed before harvest, and a number of small settlements had been abandoned as settlers sought safety from the attacks.

In addition to the hundreds of buildings burned and the civilian casualties, amounting to 197 dead in 1780 alone, these raids threatened the American supply routes to Fort Plain and Fort Stanwix on the frontier. Repeated raids further depleted the ranks of the local militia, already decimated by the Battle of Oriskany, by desertions, abandonment of the valley, and occasional casualties. In response to these increasing threats, the Governor of New York, George Clinton, sent Colonel Marinus Willett to take charge of the militia and organize the defense of the valley.

That spring and summer, there were a series of small clashes between the opposing forces. On July 9 a Mohawk raiding party attacked Currytown (also known as Corrystown), but was later chased down and defeated by Willett's men. Another raiding force soon after was forced to retreat after one of its members warned local settlers. Willett's militia was successful in warding off these and other attacks.

In the fall, however, a much larger force made up of British regulars, loyalists, and Mohawk warriors entered the valley, several hundred strong. On October 24, 1781, they once again captured Currytown, but did not burn it to prevent rising smoke from warning Willett and the militia of the raid. The raid was discovered by a pair of militia scouts and warning of their presence was spread throughout the county. Before Willett was able to organize the valley's defense, the raiding party attacked a number of small towns and homesteads, burning buildings and killing settlers along the way.

Battle

On October 25, 1781, the raiding party made up of British soldiers led by Major John Ross, loyalist militiamen led by Walter Butler, and Mohawk warriors traveled through the Mohawk Valley and approached the village of Johnstown. Colonel Willett had gathered a force of patriot militiamen and begun pursuing the raiding party. Willett's force caught up with the British at Johnstown itself after noon. As the forces approached each other, a series of small skirmishes broke out in and around Johnstown.

Willett was outnumbered, but he divided his forces and sent a small group of men around the enemy flank to attack them from the rear. He advanced his men across an open field towards the British, who withdrew into the edge of a forest. There followed an intense fight, and the only artillery piece on the field, which began in the possession of Willett's men, was captured and recaptured repeatedly. For unknown reasons, the militia on Willett's right flank suddenly turned and fled in a panic, and Willett tried to halt the retreat and turn his men.

Willett was saved by the arrival of his flanking force, which attacked the British rear when they were on the verge of capitalizing on the collapse of the American right flank. The battle then broke up into small groups on both sides fighting each other. Surrounded, the British began retreating from the area towards a nearby mountaintop. Each side suffered a number of killed and wounded, though the British lost more men to capture than the Americans.

Over the days following the battle, the British force withdrew towards their landing on Lake Oneida, still pursued by Willett's militia, despite a snowstorm which slowed both forces. Willett caught up with the British near West Canada Creek, and in the ensuing skirmish the captain of the Loyalist militia, Walter Butler, was killed. Several men who were present during the event or shortly thereafter testified to the specifics in their (Revolutionary War) pension applications (RWPA).

That portion of the river was later named Butler's Ford. Following this skirmish and satisfied with their victory, Willett and his forces turned around and headed for their homes.

Aftermath

Willett's victory at Johnstown occurred at about the same time that word reached the area of the British surrender at Yorktown. Consequently, it marked the last significant conflict in the Mohawk Valley. The Treaty of Paris formally concluded the American War of Independence in 1783.

References

Further reading
Decker, Lewis G. Images of America: Johnstown. Arcadia Publishing (an imprint of Tempus Publishing, Inc.); Charleston, SC. 1999. .
Simms, Jeptha R., "The Frontiersmen of New York", 1883, G.C. Riggs
Watt, Gavin, The Burning of the Valleys, 1997,

External links
The Hall Battle, or The Battle of Johnstown accessed February 21, 2009

Johnstown
Johnstown
Johnstown
Johnstown
Johnstown
1781 in the United States
Conflicts in 1781
Fulton County, New York
1781 in New York (state)